Viluvere  is a village in Põhja-Pärnumaa Parish, Pärnu County in western-central Estonia.

It had a station on the Tallinn - Pärnu railway line operated by Elron, which closed in December 2018.

Military commander Avdy Andresson (1899–1990) was born in Viluvere.

References

 

Villages in Pärnu County
Kreis Pernau